The Dedham Branch was a spur line of the Boston and Providence Railroad (later acquired by the Old Colony Railroad, and then by the New York, New Haven and Hartford Railroad), opened in 1835, which ran from the junction with the main line (now the Providence/Stoughton Line and part of the Franklin Line) at Readville through to central Dedham; it was the first railroad branch line in Massachusetts.  In 1966, it became part of the MBTA Commuter Rail system, but was abandoned the next year.

History

Pre-MBTA

The Boston and Providence Railroad (B&P) opened on June 4, 1834, from Boston to south of Readville, and from Readville to Canton (now Canton Junction) on September 12 of that year.  Initially, there were no branches off the B&P main line, but, on February 5, 1835, the Dedham Branch opened from Readville to Dedham (the first railroad branch line in Massachusetts); the B&P had previously provided stagecoach shuttles along this route, starting July 28, 1834.  For the first seven years of the Dedham Branch's existence, service along the branch frequently switched between Boston-Dedham through trains (also known as "Dedham Specials") and horse-drawn cars cut out of Providence trains at Readville; from June 1842 onward, however, Boston-Dedham through trains were a permanent fixture of the B&P system.  These trains were the first B&P trains reliably scheduled to depart Boston after 5:00 P.M., and, thus, the first B&P commuter rail service usable by those on a 9-to-5 schedule.

Starting in May 1849, Norfolk County Railroad trains ran via the Dedham Branch, using it and the B&P main line as its entry to Boston; this ended when the Boston and New York Central Railroad (the successor to the Norfolk County) opened its own route from Islington to Boston in January 1855, but resumed in August 1855 as the result of an injunction preventing the operation of the B&NYC's new Islington-Boston route, before ending again in March 1857.

In June 1850, a new B&P branch opened from Tollgate station to Dedham via West Roxbury, and all B&P Boston-Dedham commuter service was shifted to this new route.  Passenger service on the original Dedham Branch continued (although not scheduled for Boston commuting), but was switched to a combination of through trains and horse-drawn Readville-Dedham shuttles.  Even after the resumption of Dedham commuter service via Readville in 1855, most Dedham trains still ran via West Roxbury instead of Readville, and some Readville-Dedham service still consisted of horse-drawn shuttles, which were only discontinued in 1875.

In April 1888, the B&P was leased by the Old Colony Railroad, which was, in turn, leased by the New York, New Haven and Hartford Railroad (NYNH&H) in March 1893, but commuter service continued.  Starting in 1926, service to Dedham was provided by trains running in a loop via the B&P mainline and Dedham Branch outbound and the West Roxbury branch inbound, or vice versa.  This ended in 1938, and, at some point between then and April 1940, all service on the Dedham Branch was discontinued; however, service via the original Dedham Branch resumed later in 1940 when the portion of the former West Roxbury Branch between West Roxbury and Dedham was abandoned (the remainder of the West Roxbury Branch continued to see service from Needham Branch and West Medway Branch trains).

The River Street grade crossing was replaced with a railroad bridge in 1893.

MBTA era

The Massachusetts Bay Transportation Authority (MBTA) was formed in 1964 out of Boston's Metropolitan Transit Authority (M.T.A.), largely in order to save the rapidly declining commuter rail lines feeding into Boston.  In April 1966, the MBTA began subsidising continued NYNH&H commuter rail service on four of the NYNH&H's six commuter rail lines entering Boston from the southwest; the NYNH&H received subsidies to pay for continued service on the Franklin Line, Needham Line, Dedham Branch, and Millis Branch (the latter two each having only one daily round trip by then, service having been reduced to that level in 1959 and 1955 respectively), but not for service along the Shore Line (which provided commuter service from Boston to Providence, as well as carrying long-distance trains from New York) or Stoughton Branch, both now part of the MBTA's Providence/Stoughton Line.  Despite now being subsidised by the MBTA, commuter rail service on both the Dedham and Millis Branches (by now consisting only of a single rush-hour round trip in each direction daily) was discontinued a year later, on April 21, 1967.

The NYNH&H was merged into Penn Central at the end of 1968.  The B&P, legally still separate from the NYNH&H, was merged into Penn Central in 1971; in June 1970, however, Penn Central had filed for bankruptcy (at the time, this was the largest corporate bankruptcy in U.S. history, and led directly to the formation of Amtrak).  To maintain control over commuter-rail rights-of-way in the event of a possible liquidation of Penn Central, the MBTA purchased, in January 1973, all the rail lines used at the time by its commuter rail services, as well as several freight-only lines (including the Dedham Branch) and abandoned rights-of-way; although some of these lines have since seen commuter-rail service restored by the MBTA, the Dedham Branch remains inactive.

References

External links

 
Defunct Massachusetts railroads
MBTA Commuter Rail
History of Dedham, Massachusetts